MediaCorp Channel 8's television series Good Luck is a Lunar New Year drama serial produced by MediaCorp Singapore in 2014. The series is about an estranged family and how they reconcile their conflicts and differences to reunite in time to welcome a new year and celebrate longevity, happiness and wealth.

As of 4 March 2015, all 20 episodes of Good Luck have been aired on MediaCorp Channel 8.

Episodic guide

See also
 List of MediaCorp Channel 8 Chinese Drama Series (2010s)
 Good Luck

References

Lists of Singaporean television series episodes